Vysoká Pec refers to the following places in the Czech Republic:

 Vysoká Pec (Chomutov District)
 Vysoká Pec (Karlovy Vary District)